The Four-Power Pact, also known as the Quadripartite Agreement, was an international treaty between Britain, France, Italy, and Nazi Germany that was initialled on 7 June 1933 and signed on 15 July 1933 in the Palazzo Venezia, Rome. The Pact was not ratified by the French Parliament.

Background 
Against the backdrop of the Great Depression and the Nazi rise to power, Benito Mussolini called for the creation of the Four-Power Pact on 19 March 1933 as a better means of ensuring international security. Under the plan, smaller nations would have less of a voice in great power politics. Representatives of Britain, France, Germany and Italy signed a diluted version of Mussolini's Four-Power Pact proposal.

Mussolini's chief motive in suggesting the pact was his wish for closer relations with France. Though Mussolini's purpose may have been to calm Europe's nerves, the pact actually caused the opposite result.  It reaffirmed each country's adherence to the Covenant of the League of Nations, the Locarno Treaties and the Kellogg-Briand Pact.

The pact was intended to be the solution to the issue of sovereign powers coming together and operate in an orderly way, which had been the purpose of the League of Nations. Mussolini's goal was to reduce the power of the small states in the League of Nations by a bloc of major powers.

The Four-Power Pact had little significance but was not completely devoid of merit. The Four-Power Pact was supposed to be a solution to the exploitation of the balance of power, which was of interest to Italy and also appealed to the British.

However, the pact faced speculation in France and Germany. Since London and Rome were close enough to mediate between Paris and Berlin, France was justifiably alarmed.

Outcome 
The document that was signed bore little resemblance to the initial proposal. In practice, the Four-Power Pact proved of little significance in international affairs, but it was one of the factors contributing to the German-Polish Non-Aggression Pact of 1934.

It has been argued that the Four-Power Pact could have safeguarded the European balance of power with the hope of balancing peace and security in Europe. However, the Great Depression was abundant in Europe, and the rise of Hitler to power also makes the idea unlikely. Poland's reliance on France had been weakened, and differing attitudes emerged of the pact between Poland and Czechoslovakia. Opposition to the revision of the Four-Power Pact was expressed by Poland and the Little Entente, as apparent in the French dilution of the pact in this final form. It is apparent that the Four-Power pact had a negative impact of France's allies in Central and Eastern Europe.

Role of Hitler 

The rise of Adolf Hitler to power was an adequate reason to propose alternative power arrangements. However, what had started as an alternative to the League of Nations ended as a reassertion of devotion to that failing institution. Hitler was willing to accept the gratuitous triumph of the League of Nation's death. The pact soon failed, but Britain, in particular, did not easily throw away the Pact's idea. Germany's withdrawal from the League put the Pact on hold.

The Pact had major impact on modern law. For six years, Britain would make vain attempts to make it work at nearly any cost, but the failure of the Four-Power Pact served as a warning of Germany's continued withdrawal from diplomatic relations with France and Britain in the buildup to the Second World War.

Literature 
 Francesco Salata: Il patto Mussolini, Milan, Mondadori, 1933.

Notes

References 

 Jarausch, Konrad Hugo: "The Four-Power Pact, 1933", in: The American Historical Review, Vol. 72, No. 2 (Jan., 1967), pp. 571–572.
 Mazur, Zbigniew: "Pakt Czterech", in: The American Historical Review, Vol. 86, No. 4 (Oct., 1981), p. 880.
 Wallace, W. V.: "International Affairs", in:  Royal Institute of International Affairs, Vol. 43, No. 1 (Jan., 1967), pp. 104–105.

External links 

 League of Nations in 1933

Treaties concluded in 1933
Treaties of Nazi Germany
Treaties of the United Kingdom
1933 in France
1933 in Italy
1933 in the United Kingdom
Interwar-period treaties
Treaties of the French Third Republic
Treaties of the Kingdom of Italy (1861–1946)
Italy in World War II